The Italian Chess Federation is the governing chess organization of Italy. It is a member of the Italian National Olympic Committee (CONI) and FIDE (the World Chess Federation).

Administration
 President
 President Honoris 
 Board of Directors (10 members)
 Presidential Commission (5 members)
 Board of Fiscal Directors (5 members)
 Commission of Justice and Discipline (14 members)
 Commission of Arbiters (5 members)
 Office staff (3 members)

Only the three-member office staff receives compensation.

Clubs and individual members
The Italian Chess Federation is structured in terms of clubs which are members of the federation, and individuals which are members of the clubs. All individual memberships are made through the clubs and are on a calendar year basis with the individual being a member of only one club for any particular calendar year.

2011 Membership Statistics:

 380 clubs
 14,184 individual members
 856 instructors (a part (subset) of the individual members)
 366 arbiters (a part (subset) of the individual members)

Since memberships are on an annual basis as opposed to a rolling basis, complete 2012 statistics will be not available until December 31, 2012.

See also
 International Correspondence Chess Federation (ICCF)

References

External links
 

National members of the European Chess Union
Chess in Italy
Chess
Chess organizations